State Route 204 (SR 204) is a state route in central Ohio. It starts at SR 256 in Pickerington, and ends at US 22 near Mount Perry.

History
SR 204 was designated in 1923 on what was formerly SR 470 (which existed since 1915) between SR 79 (current SR 37) and SR 40, US 22's predecessor. In 1937, SR 204 was extended west along local roads and SR 386 to SR 256. Since then, no major, functional changes have occurred to the routing.

Major intersections

State Route 204A

State Route 204A is a 0.49-mile alternate route connecting I-70 with SR 204 in Pickerington.  Route 204A runs south from I-70 to SR 204, connecting the two parallel roads.  Route 204A also serves as the off ramp for I-70 until it becomes Taylor Road and intersects SR 204. A No Outlet sign is posted because the I-70 off ramp is southbound only and there is no access northbound to I-70.

References

204
Transportation in Fairfield County, Ohio
Transportation in Perry County, Ohio